Grenivíkurvöllur is a multi-use stadium in Grenivík, Iceland. It is currently used mostly for football matches and is the home stadium of Magni Grenivík. Its capacity is around 1100.

References

Football venues in Iceland